Walk in Love is  an album by Green Velvet.

Walk in Love may also refer to:
"Walk in Love", a song by The Manhattan Transfer from Pastiche